is a Japanese professional footballer who plays as an attacking midfielder or a winger for J1 League club Kashiwa Reysol.

Career

Nagoya Grampus
Koyamatsu made his official debut for Nagoya Grampus in the J. League Division 1 on 7 March 2015 (JST) against Matsumoto Yamaga FC by scoring a goal, which was his premiere goal as a J League football player as well. He also started the match against Ventforet Kofu in Yamanashi Chuo Bank Stadium in Kofu, Japan on 14 March. However, he was subbed out in the 70th minute replaced by Kengo Kawamata, then Koyamatsu and his club lost the match 1-0.

Career statistics

Club

References

External links 
Profile at Kashiwa Reysol

 

1995 births
Living people
Association football people from Kyoto Prefecture
Japanese footballers
J1 League players
J2 League players
J3 League players
Nagoya Grampus players
J.League U-22 Selection players
Kyoto Sanga FC players
Sagan Tosu players
Kashiwa Reysol players
Association football wingers